Mount Macpherson is a  mountain summit located in the Gold Range of  the Monashee Mountains in British Columbia, Canada.


History
Mount Macpherson was named for Sir David Lewis Macpherson (1818–1896)), a Canadian businessman, member of the Senate of Canada, and Minister of the Interior. The mountain's name was officially adopted September 30, 1932, by the Geographical Names Board of Canada,  although this toponym had appeared in publications as early as 1887, if not earlier.

Climate
Based on the Köppen climate classification, Mount Macpherson is located in a subarctic climate zone with cold, snowy winters, and mild summers. Winter temperatures can drop below −20 °C with wind chill factors below −30 °C. Despite the modest elevation, the climate supports a small pocket glacier on the northeast face. Precipitation runoff from Mount Macpherson drains north into tributaries of the Columbia River.

See also

Geography of British Columbia

References

External links

 West approach trail: revelstoketrails.com
 Weather forecast: Mount Macpherson

Two-thousanders of British Columbia
Monashee Mountains
Kootenay Land District